The South African Naval Ensign is a naval ensign used by ships of the South African Navy. A variant of the White Ensign, it features a green St George's Cross with the South African flag in the canton. South Africa has since 1922 had a variety of naval ensigns which have evolved into the current ensign adopted in 1994.

History 

At the formation of the South African Naval Service in 1922, South Africa used the British White Ensign as its naval ensign, with a Union Jack in the canton and a red St George's Cross. Meanwhile, the South African national flag was flown as a jack. In 1946, following the Second World War, South Africa began to use a solid white ensign without the cross and with the then-current South African flag in the canton. This design was recommended by Chief of the General Staff General Sir Pierre van Ryneveld to Prime Minister Jan Smuts and accepted on 6 December 1945, with notice of the new ensign appearing in the Government Gazette on 26 July 1946. The new flag was, unlike the national flag, in the 1:2 proportion, meaning the national flag had to be stretched. The ensign was found to be difficult to identify.

On 15 May 1951, Director-General of Naval Forces Commodore Frederick Dean OBE recommended a new ensign:the national flag of the Union of South Africa with an upper hoist canton consisting of three equally wide horizontal stripes from top to bottom or orange, white and blue. The white stripe of the canton charged with a lion passant guardant Gules, supporting with the dexter paw four staves erect, alternatively Argent and Azure and banded Or, from the crest of the Coat of Arms of the Union of South AfricaIt appears to have not found favour in naval circles and was, as such, never flown.

In 1952, a third ensign heralded a return to the British tradition, featuring a dark green cross with the national flag in the canton. In order to accommodate the national flag in its standard 2:3 proportion, the ensign had the appearance of a Scandinavian cross. In 1959, a white fimbriation was added to separate the national flag from the cross.

On 5 March 1981, the proportions of the ensign were changed to 2:3 and the naval badge (featuring the crest of the South African Coat of Arms on a dark blue representation of the layout of the Castle of Good Hope) was added to the lower quarter.

The ensign was updated to its current form in 1994, with the national flag in the canton updated and the naval badge removed. The colour of the cross was modified slightly to match the green on the national flag.

Historical ensigns, jacks and colours

Naval ensigns and jacks

Naval colours

See also 

 List of South African flags

References 

Flags of South Africa
South African Navy
Naval ensigns